Spodnji Kocjan is a small settlement in the Municipality of Radenci in northeastern Slovenia.

References

External links
Spodnji Kocjan on Geopedia

Populated places in the Municipality of Radenci